NMEC may refer to:

 National Museum of Egyptian Civilization, history museum in Cario, Egypt
 Neonatal meningitis-causing Escherichia coli, E. coli infection leading to meningitis in newborns